Michele Di Pace (born 12 May 1960) is a former Italian sprinter who was bronze medal at the 1982 European Indoor Championships.

Career
Meteor of Italian athletics, he competed at international senior level for only one season, the 1982 (22 years) season in which he won the bronze medal at the European indoor championships and the Italian title always indoors, as well as collecting three appearances in the Italian national team and establishing his personal record, all in the 200 meters specialty.

Achievements

National titles
Di Pace won a national championship at individual senior level.
Italian Athletics Indoor Championships
200 m: 1982

See also
 Italy at the European Athletics Indoor Championships

References

External links
 

1960 births
Living people
Italian male sprinters
Sportspeople from the Province of Barletta-Andria-Trani
People from Barletta